The United States Air Force's 716th Test Squadron is a test and evaluation unit located at Arnold Air Force Base, Tennessee.  The squadron was first activated as the 6516th Logistics (Test) Squadron in 1986 at Edwards Air Force Base, California.  It was inactivated at Edwards in 1997, but reactivated ad Arnold Air Force Base, Tennessee in 2006.  It was inactivated in 2010, but reactivated in May 2022.

Lineage
 Designated as the 6516th Logistics (Test) Squadron on 15 May 1986
 Activated on 1 October 1986
 Redesignated 716 Logistics Test Squadron on 2 October 1992
 Redesignated as 716 Test Squadron on 1 Oct 1994
 Inactivated on 30 December 1997
 Activated on 1 June 2006
 Inactivated on 30 June 2010
 Activated on 2 May 2022

Assignments
 6510th Maintenance and Supply Group, 1 October 1986
 6510th Test Group (later 412th Test Group), 10 March 1989 – 30 December 1997
 704th Test Group, 1 June 2006 – 30 June 2010
 804th Test Group, 2 May 2022 – present

Stations
 Edwards Air Force Base, California, 1 October 1986 – 30 December 1997
 Arnold Air Force Base, Tennessee, 1 June 2006 – present
 Arnold Air Force Base, Tennessee, 2 May 2022 – present

Decorations
 Air Force Outstanding Unit Award 
 1 January 1996 – 31 December 1996

References

Notes
 Explanatory notes

 Citations

Military units and formations in Tennessee
0716